18th FFCC Awards
December 18, 2013

Best Picture:
12 Years a Slave

The 18th Florida Film Critics Circle Awards were given on December 18, 2013.

Winners

Best Picture
12 Years a Slave
 Runner-up: American Hustle

Best Director
Steve McQueen – 12 Years a Slave
 Runner-up: Alfonso Cuarón – Gravity

Best Actor
Chiwetel Ejiofor – 12 Years a Slave
 Runner-up: Joaquin Phoenix – Her

Best Actress
Cate Blanchett – Blue Jasmine
 Runner-up: Judi Dench – Philomena

Best Supporting Actor
Jared Leto – Dallas Buyers Club
 Runner-up: Michael Fassbender – 12 Years a Slave

Best Supporting Actress
Lupita Nyong'o – 12 Years a Slave
 Runner-up: Jennifer Lawrence – American Hustle

Best Original Screenplay
Her – Spike Jonze Runner-up: American Hustle – David O. Russell and Eric Warren Singer

Best Adapted Screenplay12 Years a Slave – John Ridley Runner-up: The Wolf of Wall Street – Terence Winter

Best Animated FeatureFrozen
 Runner-up: The Wind Rises

Best Documentary
The Act of Killing
 Runner-up: Blackfish

Best Foreign Language Film
Blue Is the Warmest Colour • France Runner-up: The Hunt • Denmark

Best Art Direction / Production DesignThe Great Gatsby – Catherine Martin and Beverley Dunn Runner-up: American Hustle – Judy Becker and Heather Loeffler

Best CinematographyGravity – Emmanuel Lubezki Runner-up: Inside Llewyn Davis – Bruno Delbonnel

Best Visual EffectsGravity
 Runner-up: The Hobbit: The Desolation of Smaug

Pauline Kael Breakout Award
Lupita Nyong'o – 12 Years a Slave
 Runner-up: Michael B. Jordan – Fruitvale Station

Golden Orange
Dana Keith of the Miami Beach Cinematheque for his tireless championing of foreign, independent and alternative film in South Florida for more than 20 years

References

External links
 

2013 film awards
2010s